Scopula confusa is a moth of the family Geometridae. It was described by Arthur Gardiner Butler in 1878. It is found in southern Japan and the Russian Far East.

References

Moths described in 1878
Moths of Japan
Moths of Asia
confusa
Taxa named by Arthur Gardiner Butler